Benedicto Sánchez de Herrera or Benito Sánchez de Herrera (1598 – 14 June 1674) was a Roman Catholic prelate who served as Bishop of Pozzuoli (1664–1674), and Bishop of Monopoli (1654–1664).

Biography
Benedicto Sánchez de Herrera was born in Navas de Jorquera, Spain in 1598.
On 17 October 1653, he was selected by the King as Bishop of Monopoli and confirmed by Pope Innocent X on 12 January 1654.
On 18 January 1654, he was consecrated bishop by Giovanni Battista Maria Pallotta, Cardinal-Priest of San Pietro in Vincoli, with Patrizio Donati, Bishop Emeritus of Minori, and Giuseppe Ciantes, Bishop of Marsico Nuovo, serving as co-consecrators. 
On 11 December 1663, he was selected as Bishop of Pozzuoli and confirmed by Pope Alexander VII on 24 March 1664.
He served as Bishop of Pozzuoli until his death on 14 June 1674.

While bishop, he was the principal co-consecrator of Pascual de Aragón-Córdoba-Cardona y Fernández de Córdoba, Archbishop of Toledo (1666).

References

External links and additional sources
 (for Chronology of Bishops) 
 (for Chronology of Bishops) 
 (for Chronology of Bishops)
 (for Chronology of Bishops)

17th-century Italian Roman Catholic bishops
Bishops appointed by Pope Innocent X
Bishops appointed by Pope Alexander VII
Bishops of Monopoli
Bishops of Pozzuoli
1598 births
1674 deaths